KDAD (103.7 FM) is a radio station broadcasting a Classic Country format. Licensed to Victor, Idaho, United States, the station is owned by Jackson Radio Group, Inc.

History
The station was assigned the calls KKTN on October 13, 2004. On April 3, 2006, the call letters were changed to KXMP; on November 1, 2006, the station became KVRG, and on September 8, 2016, the call letters were changed to the current KDAD.
The call letters were previously used by a station in Casper, Wyoming, now known as KMXW.

References

External links

DAD
Country radio stations in the United States
Radio stations established in 2004
2004 establishments in Idaho